Inside Pop: The Rock Revolution is a 1967 American television documentary by David Oppenheim about young pop and rock musicians producing music as "a symptom and generator" of social unrest and generation gaps. Hosted by Leonard Bernstein, it was commissioned by CBS and broadcast on April 25, 1967. Musicians who appeared in the documentary included singer-songwriter Janis Ian, who performed her song "Society's Child", and Beach Boys leader Brian Wilson, who performed his song "Surf's Up".

Inside Pop followed other TV programs dedicated to contemporary rock, such as a 1966 ABC News special titled Anatomy of Pop, but Oppenheim's documentary represented the first time that pop music had been presented on television as a genuine art form. This acknowledgement coincided with a newfound appreciation, by cultural commentators and scholars, of the advances that the Beatles and other contemporary artists had made during the 1960s.

Background

Bernstein, a classical composer and the director of the New York Philharmonic, was among the first American classical musicians to publicly recognize the artistic worth of the new wave of rock music led by the Beatles. The status he held among conservative and middle-aged viewers allowed him to bridge the age and philosophical divide that separated them from the youth-centered message of this new music. During the show, he described himself as "fascinated by the strange and compelling scene called 'pop music'" and said that, while the majority of it was "trash", the remainder was "so exciting and vital … it claims the attention of every thinking person". Bernstein also suggested that, while many parents might banish contemporary pop music from the family home, "I think this music has something terribly important to tell us adults."

According to Beach Boys biographer David Leaf, Inside Pop was originally intended to be a documentary focused on the Beach Boys' leader Brian Wilson, who was then in the midst of recording the album Smile. Oppenheim told Beach Boys biographer Steven Gaines: "Some person in New York was very high on Brian Wilson. I was very curious about him and his music." He said that when he entered Wilson's Laurel Way home, "Brian was looking at the TV set with the volume off and just the color, detuned, and lots of vegetables around. ... It was a strange, insulated household, insulated from the world by money....A playpen of irresponsible people."

An interview with Wilson was attempted, but Oppenheim said the filmmakers were unable to "get much out of him" and was told by one of Wilson's "odd" associates that "he's not verbal". Other discarded sequences featured Wilson at his swimming pool and recording alone and with his group at a Hollywood studio. Leaf wrote that it was later decided to expand the scope of the program due to the band's waning popularity in early 1967. There were ultimately no references to Smile in the film.

Program contents

Part I
Inside Pop opens with an interview between Bernstein and songwriter Tandyn Almer.  Bernstein then discusses the Beatles' contribution to modern songwriting, in terms of the unexpected key and tempo changes found in their songs "Good Day Sunshine" and "She Said She Said". He admires the range of musical moods evoked in contemporary pop, citing the Beatles' "Penny Lane", "Eleanor Rigby" and "Love You To" for, respectively, their trumpet solo, orchestral strings and Indian raga qualities, and the Rolling Stones' "Paint It Black" for its "arab café" mood. Seated at a piano throughout, he compares some of the Beatles' most adventurous efforts to works by classical composers Bach and Schumann; he lauds Bob Dylan's lyrics as befitting "a bombshell of a book about social criticism". Bernstein says that the poetic and subtle nature of contemporary pop lyric writing represents "one of our teenagers' strongest weapons", since: "Protected by this armor of poetry, our young lyricists can say just about anything they care to, and they do care." He also expresses admiration for the Left Banke's "Pretty Ballerina" and its use of both Lydian and Mixolydian modes, and for the Monkees' "I'm a Believer". Other artists mentioned include the Byrds, the Association and Tim Buckley.

For the end of part one, Bernstein invited teenage folk singer Janis Ian to perform "Society's Child", which she wrote about the then controversial issue of interracial romance. Due to its subject matter, the song had been banned by many radio stations.

Part II
The second part of the special includes footage filmed by Oppenheim in November 1966 of civil unrest in Los Angeles. Young people are shown protesting the police's enforcement of a curfew designed to limit their presence around Sunset Strip. Also shown are studio interviews with Los Angeles-based musicians Frank Zappa, Roger McGuinn of the Byrds, members of the bands Canned Heat, the Unidentified Flying Objects, Gentle Soul, and Los Angeles Free Press reporter Paul Robbins. All the interviewees expound on the power of music to effect change in the world. Zappa warns of an imminent "revolution", adding: "it's going to be a sloppy one, unless something is done to get it organized in a hurry."

Singer-songwriter Bobby Jameson momentarily appears as a protester in the film, albeit uncredited. Herman's Hermits also appear, as does Graham Nash of the Hollies. One of the program's final scenes is a film of Brian Wilson, on solo piano and vocals, premiering the original song "Surf's Up". In the narration accompanying his performance, Oppenheim  remarks that the song holds too much to comprehend on an initial listen, and attributes a profound and elusive quality to the composition.

Legacy

Inside Pop: The Rock Revolution premiered on the CBS network, on April 25, 1967, and represented the first time that pop music had been presented on television as a genuine art form. Through Bernstein's support and her appearance on Inside Pop, Ian's "Society's Child" became a top 20 hit in the United States. According to journalist Nick Kent, when Wilson viewed the finished documentary, he was disturbed by the praises he was afforded, thereby accelerating the collapse of the Smile album.  After Inside Pop, Almer spent some time as a staff songwriter for A&M Records and collaborated on a number of songs with Wilson.

Cast
Listed by order of first appearance:

See also

Related social and historical topics
 1966 and 1967 in music
 Acid rock
 Counterculture of the 1960s
 Freak scene
 Hippie
 Protest song
 Youth activism

Related contemporary works by the featured musicians
 Absolutely Free (The Mothers of Invention, 1967)
 Canned Heat (Canned Heat, 1967)
 "Eight Miles High" (The Byrds, 1966)
 Evolution (The Hollies, 1967)
 Freak Out! (The Mothers of Invention, 1966)
 "I Know There's an Answer" (The Beach Boys, 1966)
 The Notorious Byrd Brothers (The Byrds, 1968)
 Tim Buckley (Tim Buckley, 1966)
 We're Only in It for the Money (The Mothers of Invention, 1968)
 Younger Than Yesterday (The Byrds, 1967)

References
Notes

Citations

External links
 

1967 films
1967 documentary films
American music history
American documentary films
CBS News
Documentary films about pop music and musicians
Documentary films about the music industry
1960s English-language films
1960s American films
Documentary films about rock music and musicians